Devario kakhienensis is a freshwater fish found in the Irrawaddy basin of Myanmar and China.

References

Freshwater fish of China
Fish of Myanmar
Taxa named by John Anderson (zoologist)
Fish described in 1879
Devario